Kalashnikov may refer to:

Weapons
 Mikhail Kalashnikov, Russian military engineer and small arms designer
 Kalashnikov rifle, a series of automatic rifles based on the original design of Mikhail Kalashnikov
 AK-47
 AK-74
 Kalashnikov Concern, Russian manufacturer of the rifles and other weapons
 Kalashnikov USA, Israeli owned United States manufacturer and distributor of Kalashnikov style rifles and other weapons

Creative works
The Song of the Merchant Kalashnikov, poem about Russian fist fighting by Mikhail Lermontov, written in 1837
The Merchant Kalashnikov, opera by Anton Rubinstein, based on Lermontov's poem
Song About the Merchant Kalashnikov (film), a 1909 Russian film by Vasily Goncharov, based on Lermontov's poem
Kalasnjikov, a song from the soundtrack to Emir Kusturica's film Underground
Kalashnikov, a 2020 Russian biographical film about Mikhail Kalashnikov.

Other uses
Kalashnikov (surname), including a list of people with the name
Kalashnikov culture, a tradition of weapon ownership in Pakistan
Kalashnikov Variation, a form of the Sicilian Defense in chess

See also
 Kalashnik (disambiguation)